Samuel Cluckston (also Samuel Cluxton, Samuel Cluckstone and Samuel Klugston) (November 17, 1696 – 1751) was a member of the House of Representatives of the Colony of Connecticut from Norwalk in the sessions of October 1739 and May 1740. He was Norwalk town treasurer for several years.

He was the son of Michael Cluckston, and Mary Wakeman of Fairfield.

He established a hat manufacturing business in Norwalk as early as 1709. He was the first known hat maker in Norwalk, which would become Norwalk's largest industry by 1845.

One of the founding members of St. Paul's on the Green.

References 

1696 births
1751 deaths
American Episcopalians
City and town treasurers in the United States
American milliners
Members of the Connecticut House of Representatives
Politicians from Norwalk, Connecticut